Idalus maesi is a moth in the family Erebidae first described by Michel Laguerre in 2006. It is found in Nicaragua, Guatemala and Honduras. The habitat consists of cloud forests at altitudes between 1,444 and 2,133 meters.

Subspecies
 Idalus maesi maesi (Nicaragua)
 Idalus maesi faustinoi Espinoza, 2013 (Guatemala, Honduras)

References

Moths described in 2006
Arctiinae of South America
maesi